Boa Sven Claes-Göran Carlman (born 29 August 1943) is a Swedish curler.

In 1973 he was inducted into the Swedish Curling Hall of Fame.

Teams

References

External links
 

 The Giant Feat in Canada, the Greateast Moment for the 60th Anniversary of Djursholms Curling Club 

Living people
1943 births
Swedish male curlers
World curling champions
Swedish curling champions